Camarops is a genus of fungi within the Boliniaceae family. The widespread genus contains 19 species.

Species
Camarops alborugosa
Camarops amorpha
Camarops antillana
Camarops biporosa
Camarops flava
Camarops giganteum
Camarops goossensiae
Camarops hypoxyloides
Camarops macrocenangium
Camarops microspora
Camarops nigricans
Camarops ohiensis
Camarops peltata
Camarops petersii
Camarops plana
Camarops podocarpi
Camarops polysperma
Camarops pugillus
Camarops quercicola
Camarops rickii
Camarops rogersii
Camarops rostratus
Camarops sacciformis
Camarops scleroderma
Camarops spathulata
Camarops tubulina
Camarops ustulinoides

References

Sordariomycetes genera
Boliniales